Skins is a British teen drama created by father-and-son television writers Bryan Elsley and Jamie Brittain for Company Pictures. The seventh and final series, entitled Skins Redux, began airing on E4 on 1 July 2013 and ended on 5 August 2013. The final series sees the return of several characters from the first two generations of the show.

Summary
Notably, all of the characters featured have undergone enormous personality changes since their last appearances: Effy has cast her party-hard lifestyle and issues aside, and has become more mature and ambitious. Naomi has lost much of her ambition as a principled young woman and is now a layabout and stoner. Emily has become more confident. Cassie has overcome her mental issues, but has become solitary, serious, principled and tired, and Cook has become much more subdued, serious and calculated, as a result of having spent years on the run. In addition, the series leaves behind its traditional setting in Bristol, moving to London where Effy, Cassie and Naomi now live, as well as Manchester where Cook now lives. Its subject matter moves on from teenage problems to more adult issues, such as insider trading, terminal illness, rough living and the criminal underworld.

Background
On 8 March 2012, Channel 4 confirmed that Skins would come to an end after a seventh series of six episodes, which would feature characters from the first and second generations. The third generation would not be involved in the seventh series. Channel 4 promised "a celebration of this truly iconic series". 

Jamie Brittain, who had quit the show after series 5, returned as part of the writing staff. Brittain also revealed via Twitter that filming would begin in late October.

Series seven marked a departure in style with former stars Hannah Murray, Jack O'Connell and Kaya Scodelario returning to the roles which had shaped their careers in three individual stories, each one broadcast in two one-hour parts.

The three stories had distinct titles: 'Skins Pure' (featuring Cassie), 'Skins Rise' (featuring Cook) and 'Skins Fire' (featuring Effy). Lily Loveless (Naomi) and Kat Prescott (Emily) also appeared in guest roles. Each two-part episode centres on the characters now in their early twenties.

Episodes

References

External links

Series 07
2013 British television seasons

de:Liste der Skins-Episoden